St. Mary Magdalene's Church may refer to:

Canada
 St. Mary Magdalene Anglican Church, Mayne Island, British Columbia
 Church of St. Mary Magdalene (Toronto), Ontario

Czech Republic
 St. Mary Magdalene Church, Karlovy Vary

Estonia
 Saint Magdalene Church, Ruhnu, in Ruhnu Island, Estonia

France
 Sainte-Madeleine, Strasbourg
 La Madeleine, Paris
 Church of St. Mary Magdalene, Rennes-le-Château
 Abbey of la Madaleine, Vézelay
 Basilica of St. Mary Magdalene, Saint-Maximin-la-Sainte-Baume

Hungary
 Church of Mary Magdalene, Budapest

Israel
Church of Mary Magdalene, Mount of Olives, Jerusalem

Italy 
 Santa Maria Maddalena (disambiguation)

Latvia
 St. Mary Magdalene's Church, Riga

Lebanon
Saint Mary Magdalene Church, North Lebanon

Malta
 St Mary Magdalene Chapel, Dingli
 St. Mary Magdalene Chapel, Madliena
 Church of St Mary Magdalene, Valletta

Philippines
St. Mary Magdalene Church (Kawit), Cavite
Saint Mary Magdalene Parish Church (Pililla, Rizal)
Santa Maria Magdalena Parish Church, Magdalena, Laguna

Poland
 Church of St. Mary Magdalene, Tarnobrzeg
 St Mary Magdalene Church, Wrocław

Spain 
 Santa María Magdalena, Córdoba
 Iglesia de la Magdalena, Toledo

Sweden
 Maria Magdalena Church, Stockholm

Ukraine
 Church of St. Mary Magdalene, Lviv

United Kingdom

Buckinghamshire
 Church of St Mary Magdalene, Willen
 St Mary Magdalene's Church, Boveney

Cambridgeshire
 St Mary Magdalene Church, Ickleton

Cheshire
 St Mary Magdalene's Church, Alsager

Cornwall
 St Mary Magdalene's Church, Launceston

Cumbria
 St Mary Magdalene's Church, Broughton-in-Furness
 St Mary Magdalene's Church, Gilsland

Devon
Mary Magdalene, Chulmleigh

East Sussex
 St Mary Magdalene's Church, Bexhill-on-Sea
 St Mary Magdalen's Church, Brighton
 St Mary Magdalene's Church, St Leonards-on-Sea

Gloucestershire
 St Mary Magdalene Church, Elmstone Hardwicke

Hampshire
 Parish Church of St Mary Magdalene, New Milton

Herefordshire
 Church of St Mary Magdalene, Stretton Sugwas

Hertfordshire
 Parish Church of St Mary Magdalene, Great Offley

Kent
 Priory of St. Mary Magdalene, or Tonbridge Priory, Tonbridge

Lancashire
 St Mary Magdalene's Church, Clitheroe

Lincolnshire
St Mary Magdalene, Bailgate, Lincoln

London
 St Mary Magdalen Bermondsey
 St Mary Magdalene's Church, East Ham
 St Mary Magdalene, Enfield
 St Mary Magdalene Church, Holloway Road
 St Mary Magdalen, Milk Street
 St Mary Magdalen Roman Catholic Church, Mortlake
 Church of St Mary Magdalene, North Ockendon
 St Mary Magdalene, Paddington
 St Mary Magdalene, Richmond
 St Mary Magdalene Woolwich

Norfolk
St. Mary Magdalene Church, Sandringham

Nottinghamshire
Church of St Mary Magdalene, Hucknall
Church of St Mary Magdalene, Newark-on-Trent

Oxfordshire
St Mary Magdalen's Church, Oxford

Shropshire
St Mary Magdalene's Church, Battlefield

Somerset
 Church of St Mary Magdalene, Chewton Mendip
 Church of St Mary Magdalene, Stocklinch
 St Mary Magdalene, Taunton
 Church of St Mary Magdalene, Wookey Hole

Suffolk
 Mary Magdalen, Ipswich

West Sussex
 St Mary Magdalene's Church, Bolney
 St. Mary Magdalene and St. Denis Church, Midhurst
 St Mary Magdalene's Church, Lyminster
 St Mary Magdalene's Church, Tortington

Worcestershire
 St Mary Magdalene's Church, Croome D'Abitot

Yorkshire
 St Mary Magdalene, Campsall
 St John and St Mary Magdalene Church, Goldthorpe
 St Mary Magdalene, Yarm
 Chapel of St Mary Magdalen, Ripon

United States
 St. Mary Magdalene Church (Homestead, Pennsylvania), Homestead, Pennsylvania

See also
 Santa Maria Madalena (disambiguation)